Samantha Jones is a fictional character from the HBO franchise Sex and the City, portrayed by Kim Cattrall. Candace Bushnell created the character, based on a real-life friend, for her column "Sex and the City" in The New York Observer, which was later compiled into the book Sex and the City and adapted into the television series. Cattrall received two Screen Actors Guild Awards and a Golden Globe Award for her portrayal. Cattrall reprised the role in the films Sex and the City and Sex and the City 2, but declined to participate in the HBO Max series And Just Like That... where Samantha is an unseen character.

Bushnell also authored the young adult novels The Carrie Diaries and Summer and the City featuring the character. The Carrie Diaries was adapted into a CW prequel series of the same name, with Samantha portrayed by Lindsey Gort in the second season.

Character history

Newspaper columns 
Samantha Jones originally appeared in Candace Bushnell's column "Sex and the City" in The New York Observer, where she is introduced as a "40-ish movie producer" known for dating a multitude of younger men. Bushnell based the character on a friend she described as "kind of an expert on men and dating".

The Carrie Diaries

In the second season of the prequel series, Samantha is introduced as Carrie's enemy Donna Ladonna's cousin who was in her mid 20s and is portrayed by Lindsey Gort. In the second episode of the second season, she said that she came from the Everglades, and that she used to have alligator overturned by car for breakfast.

Sex and the City

Samantha Jones is one of four single friends portrayed in the series, a public relations professional who is a proud, confident, highly sexual woman. Most of her story lines revolve around the frequent sex and brief affairs she has. She is outspoken and a self-proclaimed "try-sexual" (meaning she'll try anything at least once). She is portrayed as brash, straightforward, highly protective of her friends and unafraid of confrontation. She also displays nonchalance toward dating and monogamy and becomes uncomfortable whenever her sexual relationships take an emotional turn.

Not much is known about Samantha's younger years. It is known that she came from a working class background, and she spent most of her teenage years selling Dilly bars at Dairy Queen to earn pocket money. Season 3 implies that she has at least two siblings, when she mentions that at her age, her mother "was saddled with three kids and a drunk husband". She later mentions partying at Studio 54 during its heyday, implying she moved sometime in the mid- to late-1970s from wherever she grew up to New York City. She has mentioned having had at least two abortions, one of which occurred while she was in college.

Samantha is the oldest of the four friends (in the final scene of the Sex and the City film, her 50th birthday is celebrated), though it is implied during the early seasons that the other three are not aware of how much older Samantha is than they are. She has her own public-relations company. In the book's prequel series, it is revealed that Carrie met Samantha first.

In the early part of the series, she lives on the Upper East Side, but ends up moving to an expensive apartment in the Meatpacking District. The move is provoked after one of her late-night visitors lets in a mugger who attacks one of her older female neighbors and Samantha incurs the wrath of a tribelike commune of her elderly neighbors.

One of Samantha's best qualities is her loyalty to her friends. When Carrie confesses to her that she's having an affair with her married ex-boyfriend "Mr. Big," and is cheating on her boyfriend, Aidan, Samantha tells her that judging is not her style and offers her support. Although she fights with Charlotte a few times, they always manage to get past their differences and make up. Despite having trouble adjusting to Miranda having a child, she willingly gives up a coveted hair appointment with a distinguished hairdresser and sends Miranda in her place, staying behind to babysit and give her friend a much-needed break. Although Miranda is usually considered Carrie's best friend, Samantha is shown to be closer with Carrie on several occasions; such as when Carrie hates an engagement ring that Miranda picks out for Aidan to give to Carrie, but loves the replacement ring selected with Samantha's help.

In the show's last season, Samantha is diagnosed with breast cancer. She faces the challenge head-on, playing with her look by wearing outrageous wigs, hats, and headscarves after she loses her hair to chemotherapy. In one of the final episodes, she gives a speech for a cancer benefit dinner, and receives a standing ovation for removing her wig onstage and admitting that she was suffering with hot flashes. The audience appreciated her candor and honesty, and many of the women in the audience stood up and removed their own wigs.

Sex and the City: The Movie

Four years later, Samantha has moved to Los Angeles with Smith to further his acting career; he's now playing a doctor on a popular daytime drama. Samantha, who visits New York City as much as possible, finds herself attracted to a hunky exhibitionist neighbor, Dante, whom she regularly sees nude when he takes a shower or has sex with various women. Dante's escapades reminds Samantha of her sexually free past and he could be considered the male version of Samantha. While she remains faithful to Smith, she finds herself questioning whether or not her strained relationship with him should be continued as she simultaneously uses food as an outlet for her sexual desires for Dante, flagrantly gaining weight in the later stages of the movie. Samantha claims 'I eat, so I won't cheat'. Samantha, realizing her true unhappiness, breaks up with Smith. Samantha seemingly returns to reside New York City. Our last view of Samantha is her celebrating her 50th birthday in Manhattan and toasting to the next fifty with Carrie, Miranda and Charlotte.

Sex and the City 2

Samantha is approached by an Arab sheikh to devise a PR campaign for his business, and he flies her and her friends on an all-expenses-paid luxury vacation to Abu Dhabi. When the girls are picnicking they meet an architect named Rikhard Spirt (Max Ryan). Meeting him later that evening out with the girls, she addresses him as "Dick Spurt" and declines his offer for a drink because of her devotion to her friends' "girls night out" but agrees to meet the next evening. While on that date Samantha is detained for having sex on the beach. With the Sheik's intervention Samantha is released, leaving her with a permanent police record. The PR meeting is cancelled, and their luxurious perks are no longer paid for. They quickly pack their bags and attempt to leave but have to retrieve Carrie's passport that she unknowingly left at the souk. Due to a mix-up the men there believe Samantha has stolen a bag. They confront her and Samantha's real bag rips open in the middle of a bustling souk and the contents, including strips of condoms, falls out. Disgusted Muslim men crowd around and  Samantha brashly responds that what they were viewing were indeed condoms and that she 'has sex'. Samantha has to be pulled away by her fearful friends. They are helped by  Muslim women in traditional wear, who let them into their home and reveal that they are wearing Louis Vuitton underneath. The Muslim women aid the girls in escaping the souk by giving them full-body niqabs to hide their identities. They leave Abu Dhabi and return to New York City. At the end of the movie Samantha has sex with Rikhard in "the land of the free and home of the hormones", at an East Hampton sand dune.

And Just Like That...

Samantha does not appear in And Just Like That..., the sequel series to Sex and the City. She is mentioned as having moved to London and being estranged from the group after Carrie dropped her as her publicist. After Mr. Big's death, Samantha sends flowers to Carrie. Carrie thanks her and is occasionally shown conversing with Samantha via text message. When Carrie travels to Paris to spread Big's ashes, she texts Samantha, who agrees to meet in London and rekindle their lost friendship.

Sex and relationships
Samantha's main love is men – many of them. Over the course of the series, she sleeps with plenty of interesting characters, including a man who will only "swing" with her if she takes an HIV test, a college student from the Midwest with the same name (Sam Jones) who is eager to lose his virginity, a guy with "funky spunk", and a trainer from her gym who brands her by shaving her pubic hair into a lightning bolt. She never lets the men stay for long, usually requiring them to leave "an hour after [she] climaxes". One of her sexual antics includes making a sex-tape to disprove tabloids' claims that she is a fag hag. She once said that she frequently loses underwear because she leaves them at the guys' places and never returns. She even slept with her good friend Charlotte's brother, prompting an angry Charlotte to call Samantha's vagina "the hottest spot in town: it's always open".

Samantha rarely dates men more than once or twice. She does, however, have a few "serious" relationships throughout the run of the series, and it was being said that before the Pilot, she was once ‘heartbroken’ by a man named Dominic Delmonico, whom she briefly met again during series.

James
Samantha meets a man named James (James Goodwin) in a jazz bar at the end of season one. Unusually for Samantha, she doesn't have sex with him immediately, taking a leaf instead from Charlotte's book, because she felt he was a man she would marry. After declaring that she was in love with him, the two finally have sex, only for Samantha to discover that James was seriously under-endowed, to the point where she could not enjoy sex. In the last episode of season one, ("Oh Come All Ye Faithful") she tells Carrie, Charlotte, and Miranda that he is only three inches long when hard, and that she doesn't even receive any pleasure out of giving him a blowjob because his penis is so small. Though she tries to work through it, she eventually ends things with him when they attend a couples' counseling session. She confesses she is unable to feel someone as small as a baby carrot, to which he replies angrily by saying that maybe her vagina is too big.

In a funny counterpoint to her predicament with James, in the second-season episode "Ex and the City," Samantha meets Mr. Too Big, who warns her of his huge endowment as he undresses. Samantha squeals with delight as the story segues to another character. Later in the episode, when Samantha reappears, she is slowly guiding Mr. Too Big between her legs. After much hesitation, she seems to finally relax while drawing him in (she thinks), only to be asked if he can start. A shocked and fearful Samantha pushes him away with her foot on his chest and begs off the encounter. At the end of this episode she unexpectedly yells "I miss James!" while her friends goofishly sing "The Way We Were" in a crowded restaurant - the exclamation is tearful, suggesting that her feelings for James may have been legitimate.

Maria Reyes
In season four, Samantha flirts with lesbianism, entering into a brief but serious relationship with an artist named Maria Reyes (Sônia Braga). The girls are completely shocked by this, more so that she is in a relationship than the fact that it's with a woman.  Charlotte proclaims, "She's not a lesbian, she probably just ran out of men!". Samantha feels she is not a relationship person, and she initially only wants to be friends with Maria. Maria tells Samantha she cannot continue being just friends with her, and Samantha decides to take a chance and kisses Maria. Samantha seems intrigued about learning the act of pleasing another woman, thus learning more about her own sexuality. Once the sex begins to dwindle and they spend a lot of time talking, Samantha begins to tire of their relationship. Maria also becomes upset when Samantha's sexual past catches up with them. Samantha ultimately misses men too much and, although Maria decides to try strap-on dildos, the two break up due to Maria's belief that Samantha has "intimacy issues".

Richard Wright
Later in season four, Samantha meets and falls in love with hotel magnate Richard Wright (James Remar). Though the two seemed well-matched, as they are both confident, highly successful, and like sleeping around and are uninterested in relationships, Samantha finds herself becoming increasingly attached to Richard. The two eventually agree to try for a monogamous relationship. However, Samantha is heartbroken when she catches him cheating on her. Despite giving Richard a second chance, she decides to end the relationship when she realizes she doesn't trust him. In the last season, she runs into Richard while out at a party with her new boyfriend, Smith, and Samantha and Richard go upstairs to have sex. During intercourse, Samantha is seen looking uninterested and pained at being with Richard. Smith waits for her downstairs, knowing what she has done, and she breaks down in his arms, apologizing to him.

Jerry Jerrod/Smith Jerrod
Samantha sees a 28-year-old waiter/aspiring actor (Jason Lewis) while dining with the girls at a new, hip restaurant called "Raw". She later returns to the restaurant alone, with the sole mission of taking him home; she succeeds, outlasting numerous other women who are there for the same purpose. At first it seems he is to be just another notch on her bedpost, and she doesn't even know his name, referring to him as "Smith" to her Jones in elaborate sexual scenarios they enact. They have adventurous, "out-of-the-box" sex, which Samantha finds exciting and refreshing. She is turned off by learning anything personal about him, such as that he is a recovering alcoholic. But she finds she is enjoying her time with him so much that she keeps seeing him.

Seeing that he is broke and struggling, Samantha uses her PR skills to jump-start Jerry's modeling and acting career, and, once she learns his birth name (Jerry Jerrod), changes it to Smith Jerrod.  Samantha likes that he is not intimidated by her success (in contrast to Carrie's ex-boyfriend, Jack Berger), and with her assistance, he quickly becomes a celebrity. He first gains attention when he models naked in an Absolut Vodka ad in Times Square, in which he appears as the "Absolut Hunk". This publicity leads to a role in a Gus Van Sant film.

Reluctant at first to admit she cares about him, Samantha misses him while he is on location. Smith returns from his film and shows her true affection, which Samantha finds unsettling. (As she explains to Carrie, he tried to do something purely perverse to her in public: "He tried to hold my hand.") Samantha struggles with Smith's status as a teen icon and their age difference. She ends up deliberately humiliating him by hooking up with her ex-flame Richard at a party she went to with Smith. After a quick bout of clearly meaningless sex with Richard, during which he talks about himself, Samantha seeks out Smith, who has been waiting for her to realize she made a mistake and come back. She tearfully confesses that she hates what she just did to him. Eventually, she begins referring to Smith as her boyfriend. It appears that the two live together, since Smith refers to her place as "home," and he has keys to the apartment.

Smith supports Samantha through her brush with cancer, even shaving his hair when her hair began falling out, and then shaving hers. Samantha has no sexual libido during chemotherapy and encourages Smith to have sex with anyone he wants while he is in Canada filming his next movie. Smith refuses, comparing her situation to winter: "just because the trees are bare doesn't mean they're dead." While he is away, he sends her unbloomed flowers with a message on the card reading "Looking forward to spring." She calls him to tell him she changed her mind about Smith having sex with other women, and Smith happily complies. Smith returns to New York in the middle of the night, flying back after their phone call to say that he loves her. Samantha replies that he "means more to [her] than any man [she's] ever known," which, for Samantha, is a huge statement. Their last scene together in the TV series shows the two having sex and Samantha enjoying herself; the previously unbloomed flowers have now begun to open.

In the movies, four years later, the pair are still together, with Samantha giving up her job and home to live in Los Angeles with him and be his publicist supporting his booming acting career. But Samantha has become restless with monogamy and resents that Smith's career has taken over her life. After a struggle with her weight and self-control, Samantha eventually decides to end their relationship. She explains that she loves herself and that’s the one relationship she needed to work on. As seen in the Sex and the City 2 movie, the two remain friends, with Smith inviting her to be his date to the premiere of his summer blockbuster, saying “my career would have never happened if it’s not for you”; and introduces her to the film's Arab financier, who invites Samantha to visit his resort in Abu Dhabi so she can plan an advertising campaign for his businesses.

References

External links
 Archive of the original Sex and the City newspaper columns

Sex and the City characters
Fictional characters from New York City
Television characters introduced in 1998
Fictional socialites
Fictional LGBT characters in television
Fictional bisexual females
Fictional characters with cancer
Female characters in television